Bir Salah is a town and commune in the Sfax Governorate, Tunisia, between El Djem and El Hencha. As of 2004 it had a population of 4,638.

See also
List of cities in Tunisia

References

Populated places in Sfax Governorate
Communes of Tunisia
Tunisia geography articles needing translation from French Wikipedia